Cyclorphan is an opioid analgesic of the morphinan family that was never marketed. It acts as a μ-opioid receptor (MOR) weak partial agonist or antagonist, κ-opioid receptor (KOR) full agonist, and, to a much lesser extent, δ-opioid receptor (DOR) agonist (75-fold lower affinity relative to the KOR). The drug was first synthesized in 1964 by scientists at Research Corporation. In clinical trials, it had relatively long duration, good absorption, and provided strong pain relief but produced psychotomimetic effects via KOR activation, so its development was not continued.

See also
 Butorphanol
 Levomethorphan
 Levorphanol
 Nalbuphine
 Oxilorphan
 Proxorphan
 Xorphanol

References

Synthetic opioids
Kappa-opioid receptor agonists
Delta-opioid receptor agonists
Dissociative drugs
Morphinans
Phenols
Cyclopropanes